Saygorytes is a genus of sand wasps in the family Crabronidae. There are about seven described species in Saygorytes.

Species
These seven species belong to the genus Saygorytes:
 Saygorytes apicalis (F. Smith, 1856)
 Saygorytes guadalajarae (R. Bohart, 1969)
 Saygorytes notipilis (R. Bohart, 1969)
 Saygorytes oraclensis (R. Bohart, 1969)
 Saygorytes phaleratus (Say, 1837)
 Saygorytes tritospilus (R. Bohart, 1969)
 Saygorytes werneri (R. Bohart, 1969)

References

External links

 

Crabronidae
Articles created by Qbugbot